Urta Kand (also Romanized as Ūrtā Kand; also known as Ūrteh Kand) is a village in Behi Dehbokri Rural District, Simmineh District, Bukan County, West Azerbaijan Province, Iran. At the 2006 census, its population was 79, in 24 families.

References 

Populated places in Bukan County